József Kucharik (1 January 1886 – 10 March 1965) was a Hungarian writer. His work was part of the literature event in the art competition at the 1932 Summer Olympics.

References

1886 births
1965 deaths
20th-century Hungarian male writers
Olympic competitors in art competitions
People from Budapest